The Tijuana Zonkeys are a Mexican professional basketball team based in Tijuana, Baja California. The Zonkeys are part of the Circuito de Baloncesto de la Costa del Pacífico (CIBACOPA). They play their home games at the Auditorio Academia Zonkeys. The team was founded in 2010, and won back-to-back championships in 2014 and 2015.

The name comes from the tradition of painting stripes on to donkeys to resemble zebras, a practice once common on the city's famed tourist strip, Avenida Revolución. Tourists would pay to take pictures with or on the zonkeys.

History 
The team was founded in 2010 and entered the league the same year. It became the first professional basketball team to play in Tijuana since the LNBP's Cosmos de Tijuana and the Tijuana Dragons of the ABA. They won their first championship in 2014 with a 4-3 finals series win over Caballeros de Culiacán.

They defeated the Halcones de Ciudad Obregón in the 2018 finals in a six-game series.

In December 2019, ex-NBA player Henry Bibby was hired as head coach ahead of the 2020 season. They also opened a new arena, the Auditorio Academia Zonkeys, moving their home games from the Auditorio Fausto Gutierrez Moreno.

Players

Current roster

Notable players 
 Adrián Zamora
 Cyrus Tate
 Jeral Davis
Marcus Morrison
Luis "Chupa" Ramirez
 Myke Ammons

See also
Tijuana Zebra
Circuito de Baloncesto de la Costa del Pacífico
Federación Mexicana de Baloncesto

References

External links 
 Tijuana Zonkeys' official website.
 Team Profile at Eurobasket.com
 Circuito de Baloncesto de la Costa del Pacífico official website

Basketball teams in Mexico
Sports teams in Tijuana
Basketball teams established in 2010
2010 establishments in Mexico